Biological databases are stores of biological information. The journal Nucleic Acids Research regularly publishes special issues on biological databases and has a list of such databases. The 2018 issue has a list of about 180 such databases and updates to previously described databases. Omics Discovery Index can be used to browse and search several biological databases.

Meta databases 
Meta databases are databases of databases that collect data about data to generate new data. They are capable of merging information from different sources and making it available in a new and more convenient form, or with an emphasis on a particular disease or organism.[metadatabase is a database model for metadata management, global query of independent database, and distributed data processing. The word metadatabase is an addition to the dictionary]. originally ,metadata was only common term referring simply to data about data  such a tags ,keywords, and markup headers.
 ConsensusPathDB: a molecular functional interaction database, integrating information from 12 others
 Entrez (National Center for Biotechnology Information)
 Neuroscience Information Framework (University of California, San Diego): integrates hundreds of neuroscience relevant resources; many are listed below

Model organism databases 
Model organism databases provide in-depth biological data for intensively studied organisms.

PomBase: the knowledgebase for the fission yeast Schizosaccharomyces pombe
SubtiWiki: integrated database for the model bacterium Bacillus subtilis

Nucleic acid databases

DNA databases 

The primary databases make up the International Nucleotide Sequence Database (INSD). The include:
 DNA Data Bank of Japan (National Institute of Genetics)
 EMBL (European Bioinformatics Institute)
 GenBank (National Center for Biotechnology Information)

DDBJ (Japan), GenBank (USA) and European Nucleotide Archive (Europe) are repositories for nucleotide sequence data from all organisms.  All three accept nucleotide sequence submissions, and then exchange new and updated data on a daily basis to achieve optimal synchronisation between them. These three databases are primary databases, as they house original sequence data. They collaborate with Sequence Read Archive (SRA), which archives raw reads from high-throughput sequencing instruments.

Secondary databases are:
 23andMe's database
 HapMap
 OMIM (Online Mendelian Inheritance in Man): inherited diseases
 RefSeq
1000 Genomes Project: launched in January 2008. The genomes of more than a thousand anonymous participants from a number of different ethnic groups were analyzed and made publicly available.
EggNOG Database: a hierarchical, functionally and phylogenetically annotated orthology resource based on 5090 organisms and 2502 viruses. It provides multiple sequence alignments and maximum-likelihood trees, as well as broad functional annotation.

Other databases
Nucleosome positioning region database

Gene expression databases (mostly microarray data)

Genome databases 
These databases collect genome sequences, annotate and analyze them, and provide public access.  Some add curation of experimental literature to improve computed annotations. These databases may hold many species genomes, or a single model organism genome.

Phenotype databases 
 PHI-base: pathogen-host interaction database. It links gene information to phenotypic information from microbial pathogens on their hosts. Information is manually curated from peer reviewed literature.
 RGD Rat Genome Database: genomic and phenotype data for Rattus norvegicus
 PomBase database: manually curated phenotypic data for the yeast Schizosaccharomyces pombe

RNA databases 

 miRBase: the microRNA database
 PolymiRTS: a database of DNA variations in putative microRNA target sites
 PolyQ: database of polyglutamine repeats in disease and non-disease associated proteins
 Rfam: a database of RNA families

Amino acid / protein databases 
Several publicly available data repositories and resources have been developed to support and manage protein related information, biological knowledge discovery and data-driven hypothesis generation. The databases in the table below are selected from the databases listed in the Nucleic Acids Research (NAR) databases issues and database collection and the databases cross-referenced in the UniProtKB. Most of these databases are cross-referenced with UniProt / UniProtKB so that identifiers can be mapped to each other.

Protein sequence databases

Protein structure databases 
 Protein Data Bank (PDB), comprising:
 Protein DataBank in Europe (PDBe)
 ProteinDatabank in Japan (PDBj)
 Research Collaboratory for Structural Bioinformatics (RCSB)
Structural Classification of Proteins (SCOP)
CATH : Protein Structure Classification database

For more protein structure databases, see also Protein structure database.

Protein model databases 
 ModBase: database of comparative protein structure models (Sali Lab, UCSF)
 Similarity Matrix of Proteins (SIMAP): database of protein similarities computed using FASTA
 Swiss-model: server and repository for protein structure models
 AAindex: database of amino acid indices, amino acid mutation matrices, and pair-wise contact potentials

Protein-protein and other molecular interactions 
 BioGRID: general repository for interaction datasets (Samuel Lunenfeld Research Institute)
 RNA-binding protein database
 Database of Interacting Proteins (Univ. of California)
 IntAct: open-source database for molecular interactions (EMBL-EBI) 
 String: an open source molecular interaction database to study interactions between proteins

Protein expression databases 
 Human Protein Atlas: aims at mapping all the human proteins in cells, tissues and organs

Signal transduction pathway databases 

 NCI-Nature Pathway Interaction Database
 Netpath: curated resource of signal transduction pathways in humans
 Reactome: navigable map of human biological pathways, ranging from metabolic processes to hormonal signalling (Ontario Institute for Cancer Research, European Bioinformatics Institute, NYU Langone Medical Center, Cold Spring Harbor Laboratory)
 WikiPathways

Metabolic pathway and protein function databases

Taxonomic databases 

Numerous databases collect information about species and other taxonomic categories. The Catalogue of Life is a special case as it is a meta-database of about 150 specialized "global species databases" (GSDs) that have collected the names and other information on (almost) all described and thus "known" species.
 BacDive: bacterial metadatabase that provides strain-linked information about bacterial and archaeal biodiversity, including taxonomy information
Catalogue of Life: a meta-database of all species on earth
 EzTaxon-e: database for the identification of prokaryotes based on 16S ribosomal RNA gene sequences
NCBI Taxonomy: a taxonomic database operated by NCBI and concentrating on all taxa for which DNA sequences are available (those sequences are stored by GenBank, another database operated by NCBI).

Image databases 
Images play a critical role in biomedicine, ranging from images of anthropological specimens to zoology. However, there are relatively few databases dedicated to image collection, although some projects such as iNaturalist collect photos as a main part of their data. A special case of "images" are 3-dimensional images such as protein structures or 3D-reconstructions of anatomical structures. Image databases include, among others:

 Allen Brain Atlas
 Digital Brain Bank
 Electron Microscopy Public Image Archive (EMPIAR)
 Image Data Resource
 Morphobank
 Morphosource

Radiologic databases 
 The Cancer Imaging Archive (TCIA)
 Neuroimaging Informatics Tools and Resources Clearinghouse

Additional databases

Exosomal databases 
 ExoCarta
 Extracellular RNA Atlas: a repository of small RNA-seq and qPCR-derived exRNA profiles from human and mouse biofluids

Mathematical model databases 
 Biomodels Database: published mathematical models describing biological processes

Radiologic databases 
 The Cancer Imaging Archive (TCIA)
 Neuroimaging Informatics Tools and Resources Clearinghouse

Databases on antimicrobial resistance rates and antibiotic consumption 
 CIPARS
 EARS-Net
 ESAC-Net

Databases on antimicrobial resistance mechanisms

Wiki-style databases 
 Gene Wiki
 WikiProfessional

Specialized databases

References

External links 
 Nucleic Acid Research Molecular Biology Database Collection – over 1,600 databases
 Nucleic Acid Research (NAR) Database Summary Paper Category List

Da